Miss America 1942, the 16th Miss America pageant, was held at the Warner Theater in Atlantic City, New Jersey on September 12, 1942. Miss Texas, Jo-Carroll Dennison won the title after winning the swimsuit and talent categories. She was the first Miss Texas to win the Miss America title.

Dennison became an actress and had roles in films such as Winged Victory. She was married at one time to comedian Phil Silvers.

Results

Awards

Preliminary awards

Other awards

Contestants

References

Secondary sources

External links
 Miss America (1942)

1942
1942 in the United States
1942 in New Jersey
September 1942 events
Events in Atlantic City, New Jersey